Robin Roberts may refer to:
 Robin Roberts (newscaster) (born 1960), Good Morning America anchor and former ESPN anchor
 Robin Roberts (baseball) (1926–2010), American baseball player

 Rockin' Robin Roberts (1940–1967), singer

See also
 Robin Robertson (born 1955), Scottish poet
 Robert Roberts (disambiguation), multiple people